Ivor Davies may refer to:
 Ivor Davies (politician) (1915–1986), British Liberal Party member and parliamentary candidate
 Ivor Davies (artist) (born 1935), Welsh artist
 Ivor Davies (priest) (1917–1992), British priest and Archdeacon of Lewisham
 Ivor Davies (rugby, born 1906) (1906–1963), Welsh rugby union and rugby league footballer who played in the 1930s
 Ivor Davies (rugby union, born 1892) (1892–1959), Welsh international rugby union player
 Ifor Davies (1910–1982), Welsh Labour Party politician
 Real name of Ivor Novello (1893–1951), Welsh actor, playwright and composer
 Ivor R. Davies (1901–1967), English organist and composer of church anthems